Cañizares is the surname of:

Alejandro Cañizares (born 1983), Spanish golfer
Antonio Cañizares Llovera (born 1945), Spanish Roman Catholic cardinal, Archbishop of Valencia
Avelino Cañizares (1919–1993), Cuban former baseball player
Bárbaro Cañizares (born 1979), Cuban baseball player in the Mexican League
Claude R. Canizares, Massachusetts Institute of Technology former Vice President and physics professor
Inés Cañizares (born 1970), Spanish economist and politician
Jesús Cañizares Sánchez (born 1992), Spanish footballer
Jorge Canizares-Esguerra, faculty member in the History Department at the University of Texas at Austin
José de Cañizares (1676–1750), Spanish playwright, cavalry officer, public official and author
José María Cañizares (born 1947), Spanish golfer
Juan Cañizares Tan (1922–2005), Philippine union organizer
Juan Manuel Cañizares (born 1966), Spanish flamenco guitarist and composer
Miguel Navarro Cañizares (1835–1913), Spanish painter and art teacher
Osvaldo Lara Cañizares (born 1955), Cuban retired sprinter
Santiago Cañizares (born 1969), Spanish retired football goalkeeper

See also
Jorge Canizares-Esguerra, Ecuadorian professor of history at the University of Texas at Austin

Spanish-language surnames